Giulia Anghelescu (born 7 November 1984), better known as simply Giulia is a Romanian pop/dance recording artist and occasional DJ on the Pro FM in Romania. She was the vocalist of Romanian band DJ Project 'till 2011.

She has one daughter, named Antonia Sabina.

References

External links
Site oficial

1984 births
Living people
21st-century Romanian women singers
21st-century Romanian singers
Romanian women pop singers
People from Galați